Thomas Raymond (died 1418), of Simpson in Holsworthy, Devon, was an English politician.

Family
He was the father of Richard Raymond.

Career
He was a Member (MP) of the Parliament of England for Barnstaple in 1372, January 1377 and October 1377, for Dartmouth in October 1377, for Plympton Erle in 1381, for Exeter in May 1382, February 1388 and January 1404, and for Tavistock in October 1377 and November 1384.

References

14th-century births
1418 deaths
English MPs 1372
English MPs January 1377
English MPs October 1377
English MPs 1381
English MPs May 1382
English MPs February 1388
English MPs January 1404
English MPs November 1384
Members of the Parliament of England (pre-1707) for Barnstaple
Members of the Parliament of England for Dartmouth
Members of the Parliament of England for Plympton Erle
Members of the Parliament of England (pre-1707) for Exeter
Members of the Parliament of England for Tavistock